FC Spartak Gorno-Altaysk was a Russian football team from Gorno-Altaysk. It played professionally in 1992 in the Russian Second Division, taking 11th place in the Zone 6.

External links
  Team history at KLISF

Association football clubs established in 1992
Association football clubs disestablished in 2006
Defunct football clubs in Russia
Sport in Gorno-Altaysk
1992 establishments in Russia
2006 disestablishments in Russia